Chase Pearson (born August 23, 1997) is a Canadian professional ice hockey centre for the Grand Rapids Griffins in the American Hockey League (AHL) as a prospect to the Detroit Red Wings of the National Hockey League (NHL). He was drafted 140th overall by the Red Wings in the 2015 NHL Entry Draft.

Playing career
Pearson played college ice hockey at Maine where he was a two-time captain. During his three years at Maine he recorded 37 goals and 41 assists in 107 games. During the 2018–19 season he was named the Hockey East Best Defensive Forward and was named to the Hockey East All-Second Team. 

On March 18, 2019, Pearson signed a two-year, entry-level contract with the Detroit Red Wings. He was assigned to the Red Wings' AHL affiliate, the Grand Rapids Griffins following the conclusion of his collegiate career. During the 2018–19 season, he recorded two goals in ten games for the Griffins. 

During the 2019–20 season, in his first full professional season, he recorded eight goals and 14 assists in 59 games, during a season that was cancelled due to the COVID-19 pandemic. During the 2020–21 season, in his second full professional season, he ranked third on the Griffins in scoring with eight goals and 14 assists in 28 games. On August 5, 2021, the Red Wings re-signed Pearson to a one-year contract.

Pearson made his professional debut for the Red Wings on March 24, 2022. During the 2021–22 season, he recorded four hits and 7:40 average time on ice in three games with the Red Wings. On July 21, 2022, the Red Wings re-signed Pearson to a one-year, two-way contract.

Personal life
Pearson was born in Cornwall, Ontario, and grew up in Alpharetta, Georgia. Pearson's father, Scott, is a former professional ice hockey player, who played in 292 NHL games.

Career statistics

Awards and honours

References

External links
 

1997 births
Living people
Canadian ice hockey centres
Detroit Red Wings players
Grand Rapids Griffins players
Maine Black Bears men's ice hockey players
Sportspeople from Cornwall, Ontario
Youngstown Phantoms players